Manov (Cyrillic: Манов) is a Slavic masculine surname, its feminine counterpart is Manova (Манова). It may refer to:
Paulina Manov (born 1975), Serbian actress
Todor Manov  (born 1969), Bulgarian wrestler

Bulgarian-language surnames